Anthony Milner (27 March 1947 – 6 July 2015) was an English actor. Milner was born in England in March 1947. In 1984, he appeared in a play called Canterbury Tales, which was adapted from Geoffrey Chaucer's book of the same name by Phil Woods and director Michael Bogdanov. Milner married actress Moira Brooker in 1985, and had two children. Milner died on July 6, 2015, at the age of 68.

Filmography

References

External links 

1947 births
2015 deaths
20th-century British male actors
21st-century British male actors
British male film actors